Seven Life Lessons of Chaos: Spiritual Wisdom From the Science of Change is a book by Western Connecticut State University English Professor John Briggs and Physicist F. David Peat (who also co-authored Turbulent Mirror). Originally published in 1999 by HarperCollins, the book consists of 175 pages plus notes and an index.

1999 non-fiction books
Philosophy books
HarperCollins books
Self-help books